The 2011 Challenge Cup (also known as the Carnegie Challenge Cup for sponsorship reasons) was the 110th staging of the most competitive European rugby league tournament at club level and was open to teams from England, Wales, Scotland, France and Russia. It began its preliminary stages in January 2011. The Challenge Cup is  Warrington Wolves were the reigning champions, but lost 24 - 44 at home to the Wigan Warriors in the quarter finals, who went on to win the title after beating Leeds Rhinos 28 - 18 in the final. Rugby Football League chief executive Nigel Wood reported that in 2011 Challenge Cup viewing figures on BBC Television had increased by 21.3 per cent compared to 2010 and are 26.8 per cent higher than they were in 2009.

Preliminary round

The draws for the Preliminary and First Round was made on 7 December 2010. Ties were played on 8–10 January with some ties played on 15–16 January.

Pool A

Pool B

Round 1
First Round played weekend of 22 January with some ties played weekend of 29 January and 5 February. The match between Kells and Bradford Dudley Hill took place on 12 February.

Pool A

Pool B

Round 2

The draw for the Second Round was made on 24 January. Ties played weekend of 5 February with some ties played weekend of 12 February. The match between Fryston Warriors and Bradford Dudley Hill took place on 19 February.

Pool A

Pool B

Round 3

Third Round draw was made on 15 February. Ties were played on weekend of 5 March.

Round 4

Fourth Round draw was made on 20 March. Ties were played on weekend of 7 May.

Round 5

Quarter finals

Semi finals

Final 

The two sides with the most Challenge Cup Final appearances had only met twice before, Wigan winning both times (1994 and 1995). Leeds had played in the previous year's Challenge Cup final loss, but it was the Wigan's Warriors' first visit to the new Wembley Stadium. Abide with me was sung by Rhydian Roberts.

The game was broadcast by BBC with John Kear and Dave Woods commentating, as well as additional commentary from Tanya Arnold, Clare Balding, Jonathan Davies, Robbie Hunter-Paul, Justin Morgan and Brian Noble. The English national anthem was then sung before referee Phil Bentham, overseeing his first Challenge Cup final, blew time on and Leeds's captain Kevin Sinfield kicked off.

UK Broadcasting rights
Selected matches were televised solely by the BBC, for the last time. The following season the BBC and Sky Sports shared a selected round 4 and round 5 match and the BBC televising two quarter final matches and Sky Sports televising the other two quarter finals. The BBC still televised the semi finals and the final.

1 Except Northern Ireland.

2 Except Scotland which was televised live on BBC Two Scotland.

References

External links
 Challenge Cup on the Rugby Football League's website
Official Website

Challenge Cup
Challenge Cup
Challenge Cup
2011 in French rugby league
2011 in Welsh rugby league
2011 in Russian sport
2011 in Scottish sport